Paris-Sud University (French: Université Paris-Sud), also known as University of Paris — XI (or as Université d'Orsay before 1971), was a French research university distributed among several campuses in the southern suburbs of Paris, including Orsay, Cachan, Châtenay-Malabry, Sceaux, and Kremlin-Bicêtre campuses. The main campus was located in Orsay.

Starting from 2020, University Paris Sud has been replaced by the University of Paris-Saclay in The League of European Research Universities (LERU).

Paris-Sud was one of the largest and most prestigious universities in France, particularly in science and mathematics. The university was ranked 1st in France, 9th in Europe and 37th worldwide by 2019 Academic Ranking of World Universities (ARWU) in particular it was ranked as 1st in Europe for physics and 2nd in Europe for mathematics.

Five Fields Medalists and two Nobel Prize Winners have been affiliated to the university.

On 16 January 2019, Alain Sarfati was elected President of Université Paris-Sud. He succeeds Sylvie Retailleau who was elected as President of ComUE Université Paris-Saclay.

History 
Paris-Sud was originally part of the University of Paris, which was subsequently split into several universities. After World War II, the rapid growth of nuclear physics and chemistry meant that research needed more and more powerful accelerators, which required large areas. The University of Paris, the École Normale Supérieure and the Collège de France looked for space in the south of Paris near Orsay. Later some of the teaching activity of the Faculty of Sciences in Paris was transferred to Orsay in 1956 at the request of Irène Joliot-Curie and Frédéric Joliot-Curie. The rapid increase of students led to the independence of the Orsay Center on 1 March 1965 (sometimes called "Université d'Orsay" thereafter). The institution became the "University of Paris-Sud (Paris XI)" in 1971.

Paris-Sud hosted a great number of laboratories on its large (236 ha) campus. Many of the top French laboratories were among them especially in particle physics, nuclear physics, astrophysics, atomic physics and molecular physics, condensed matter physics, theoretical physics, electronics, nanoscience and nanotechnology. University of Paris-Sud comprised some 104 research units.

Pierre-Gilles de Gennes and Albert Fert, two Nobel Prize winners of physics, were affiliated to the University of Paris-Sud. A number of the most renowned French mathematicians were affiliated with the University of Paris-Sud as well. Among them are the Fields medalists Pierre Deligne, Laurent Lafforgue, Jean-Christophe Yoccoz, Wendelin Werner and Ngô Bảo Châu.

Paris-Sud also comprised biology and chemistry laboratories,  engineering and technology schools and had established partnerships with many of the surrounding technology centres and Grandes Ecoles. It also included Schools of Law, Economics and Management.

Starting from 2020, University Paris Sud has been replaced by the University of Paris-Saclay.

Notable people

Fields Medal 
Pierre Deligne (Fields Medal, 1978)
Jean-Christophe Yoccoz (Fields Medal, 1994)
Laurent Lafforgue (Fields Medal, 2002)
Wendelin Werner (Fields Medal, 2006)
Ngô Bảo Châu (Fields Medal, 2010)

Nobel Prize 
Pierre-Gilles de Gennes (Nobel Prize in physics, 1991)
Albert Fert (Nobel Prize in physics, 2007)
Alain Aspect (Nobel Prize in Physics, 2022)

Others 

Aristides Baltas, philosopher of science, physicist, and former Minister of Culture and Sports of Greece, as well as Minister of Education and Religious Affairs  
Katarina Barley, German politician and lawyer, current Federal Minister of Justice and Consumer Protection in the fourth Cabinet of Angela Merkel
Agnès Barthélémy, physicist, expert on nanostructures
Étienne-Émile Baulieu, chemist
Louis-Marie de Blignières, Traditionalist Catholic priest
Charles Édouard Bouée, CEO of Roland Berger Consulting
Olivier Bohuon, Chief Executive of Smith & Nephew plc
Marielle Chartier, physicist
Jean-Louis Colliot-Thélène, French mathematician
Monique Combescure, French mathematical physicist
Michel Davier, physicist
Adrien Douady, mathematician
Cornelia Druțu, Romanian mathematician, professor of mathematics at the University of Oxford
Anne Dambricourt-Malassé, paleoanthropologist 
Jean-Marc Fontaine, mathematician
Erol Gelenbe, Professor Univ. Paris-Sud (1979-1986), Computer Scientist, Fellow of the French Academy of Technologies, the Royal Academy of Science, Letters and Fine Arts of Belgium, The Science Academy Society of Turkey and other academies, Mustafa Prize 2017.
Jean Ginibre, mathematician
Henri B. Kagan, chemist, winner of the Wolf Prize in Chemistry (2001)
André Lagarrigue, physicist
Serge Latouche, economist
Jean-Yves Le Gall, President of National Centre for Space Studies (CNES)
André Neveu, physicist
Véronique Newland, CEO, New Vision Technologies
Bernadette Perrin-Riou, mathematician and recipient of the Satter Prize
Bertrand Serlet, former Senior Vice President of Software Engineering at Apple Inc.
François Baccelli, mathematician and engineer

Rankings

 Paris-Sud was ranked 1st in France, 9th in Europe and 37th worldwide by the 2019 Academic Ranking of World Universities (ARWU). (5th in Mathematics, 9th in Physics worldwide).
 In October 2015, The University of Paris Sud has been ranked 10th best university worldwide in the Times Higher Education Under 50 which is a ranking of the world top 100 universities under 50 years old.
 QS Ranking has ranked the University 262nd in the world, 97th in Natural Science, 101-150th in Medicine and 285th in Engineering and Technology.

Points of interest
 Parc botanique de Launay

See also

 Institute of Space and Telecommunications Law (IDEST)
 University of Paris

References

External links
Paris-Sud University official website (in English)
Paris-Sud University official website (in French)

Defunct universities in Paris
Buildings and structures in Essonne
Educational institutions established in 1971